Phenazepam (also known in Russia as bromdihydrochlorphenylbenzodiazepine) is a benzodiazepine drug, which was developed in the Soviet Union in 1975, and now produced in Russia and some CIS countries.

Phenazepam is used in the treatment of various mental disorders such as psychiatric schizophrenia and anxiety. It can be used as a premedication before surgery as it augments the effects of anesthetics. Recently, phenazepam has gained popularity as a recreational drug; misuse has been reported in the United Kingdom, Finland, Sweden, and the United States.

Indications
 Neurosis, neurosis-like, psychopathic (personality disorder), psychopathic-like and other conditions accompanied by fear, anxiety, increased irritability, and emotional lability
 Brief reactive psychosis and hypochondriasis-senestopathic syndrome
 Vegetative dysfunction and vegetative lability
 Insomnia
 Alcohol withdrawal syndrome
 Temporal lobe epilepsy and myoclonic epilepsy (used only occasionally as better options exist)
 Hyperkinesia and tics
 Muscle spasticity

Usually, a course of treatment with phenazepam should not normally exceed 2 weeks (in some cases therapy may be prolonged for up to 2 months) due to the risk of drug abuse and dependence. To prevent withdrawal syndrome, it is necessary to reduce the dose gradually.

Chemistry
Phenazepam is a drug of the benzodiazepine class. Benzodiazepine drugs contain a benzene ring fused to a diazepine ring, which is a seven membered ring with the two nitrogen constituents located at R1 and R4. The benzyl ring of phenazepam is substituted at R7 with a bromine group. Like most benzodiazepines, phenazepam has a phenyl ring in R5 which is substituted by chlorine in the R2' group. Phenazepam also contains an oxygen group double bonded to R2 of its diazepine ring to form a ketone. This oxygen substitution at R2 is shared with other benzodiazepine drugs with the suffix -azepam.

Like other benzodiazepines, phenazepam (7-bromo-5-(2-chlorophenyl)-1,3-dihydro-1,4-benzodiazepin-2-one) is composed of a benzene ring fused to a seven-membered 1,4-diazepine ring. A 2-chlorophenyl ring is attached at the 5-position and a bromine is attached at the 7-position. Phenazepam has a molecular formula of C15H10BrClN2O and a molecular weight of 349.6 g/mol.

Side effects
Side effects include hiccups, dizziness, loss of coordination and drowsiness, along with anterograde amnesia which can be quite pronounced at high doses. As with other benzodiazepines, in case of abrupt discontinuation following prolonged use, severe withdrawal symptoms may occur including restlessness, anxiety, insomnia, seizures, convulsions and death, though because of its intermediate half-life as well as that of its active metabolites, these withdrawal symptoms may take two or more days to manifest.

Contraindications and special caution
Benzodiazepines require special precaution if used in the elderly, during pregnancy, in children, alcohol or drug-dependent individuals and individuals with comorbid psychiatric disorders.

Phenazepam should not be taken with alcohol or any other CNS depressants. Phenazepam should not be used therapeutically for periods of longer than one month including tapering on and off the drug as recommended for any benzodiazepine in the British national formulary. Some patients may require longer term treatment.

Phenazepam was found to be a component in some herbal incense mixtures in Australia and New Zealand in 2011, namely "Kronic". The particular product variety was withdrawn shortly from the market after and replaced with a new formulation.

Synthesis

First, 2-(o-chlorobenzoylamino)-5-bromo-2-chlorobenzophenone is prepared by acylation of p-bromoaniline with o-chlorobenzoic acid acyl chloride in the presence of a zinc chloride catalyst. This is hydrolysed with aqueous sulfuric acid to yield 2-amino-5-bromo-2'-chlorobenzophenone, which is then acylated with hydrochloride of aminoacetic acid acyl chloride in chloroform to form 2-(aminomethylkarbonylamino)-5-bromo-2-chlorobenzophenone hydrochloride, which is converted to a base with aqueous ammonia and then thermally cyclized to bromodihydrochlorophenylbenzodiazepine (phenazepam).

Hydrochloride of aminoacetic acid acyl chloride is prepared by chemical treating glycine with phosphorus pentachloride (PCl5) in chloroform.

This method of Phenazepam synthesis was developed in the 1970s at the Physico-Chemical Institute of the Academy of Sciences of the Ukrainian SSR.

Detection in biological fluids
Phenazepam may be measured in blood or plasma by chromatographic methods. Blood phenazepam concentrations are typically less than 30 μg/L during therapeutic usage, but have frequently been in the 100–600 μg/L range in automotive vehicle operators arrested for impaired driving ability.

Legal status

China
As of October 2015, phenazepam is a controlled substance in China.

United States
Under federal United States law, phenazepam is not currently classified as a controlled substance, as the Federal Analog Act only provides for automatic assumed classification of chemicals "substantially similar" to existing Schedule I or Schedule II drugs, whereas all controlled benzodiazepines under the Controlled Substances Act are classified as Schedule IV. Although phenazepam is currently not controlled, sale for human use remains illegal in the United States. Suppliers attempt to circumvent this regulation by placing a "Not for human use" disclaimer on the product's label.

Individual states in the United States often ban these analog drugs by name as they appear. Since 2012, Louisiana has classified phenazepam as a controlled dangerous substance. This ban affects several products, some of which were sold at retail stores under the guise of air freshener or similar, containing phenazepam yet claiming not to be for human use. This legislation was introduced after one such product, branded as "Zannie" and marketed as an air freshener rapidly gained publicity as the subject of numerous media reports, attracting the attention of officials. The ensuing investigation effort, led by Senator Fred Mills and Louisiana Poison Center Director Mark Ryan, positively identified the active ingredient of "Zannie" as phenazepam. According to Ryan, chemical analysis identified the active ingredient as "100 percent phenazepam".

Paul Halverson, director and state health officer for the Arkansas Department of Health, approved an emergency rule to ban the sale and distribution of phenazepam shortly after the Louisiana ban.

United Kingdom
Phenazepam is a class C drug in the UK.

The UK home office banned importation of phenazepam on Friday 22 July 2011 while it drafted legislation, released in January 2012 to become law at the end of March 2012. The bill was quashed following advice from the ACMD as it included two non-abusable steroids. There was a new discussion about its fate on April 23, 2012, where it was decided that the bill would be rewritten and phenazepam would still be banned.

It was eventually banned on June 13, 2012 as a class C, schedule II drug.

Elsewhere
Phenazepam was classified as a narcotic in Finland in July, 2014.

Phenazepam is considered a narcotic in Norway, as per a March 23, 2010 Health Department addition to the Regular Narcotic List.

In Russia, while the drug is considered a prescription medication (but not a controlled one, as all other benzodiazepines except tofisopam), some pharmacies sell it without prescriptions required. Since March 22, 2021 phenazepam must be a controlled substance in Russia.

In Estonia, phenazepam is a Schedule IV substance under the Narcotic Drugs and Psychotropic Substances Act. Schedule IV is the lowest classification of psychoactive substances in Estonia. It includes prescribable drugs, including other benzodiazepines.

UN Single Convention on Narcotic Drugs
On 8 March 2016 at its 59th Session, the Commission on Narcotic Drugs (CND) added Phenazepam to relevant schedules of the Single Convention on Narcotic Drugs of 1961.

Trade names
RU:
 «Феназепам» (Phenazepam) tablets 0.5, 1 and 2.5 mg, solution for intramuscular and intravenous injection 1 mg/mL (0.1%)
 «Элзепам» (Elzepam) tablets 0.5 and 1 mg, solution for intramuscular and intravenous injection 1 mg/mL (0.1%)
 «Фензитат» (Phenzitat) tablets 0.5 and 1 mg
 «Фенорелаксан» (Phenorelaxan) tablets 0.5 and 1 mg, solution for intramuscular and intravenous injection 1 mg/mL (0.1%)
 «Транквезипам» (Trankvezipam) tablets 0.5 and 1 mg, solution for intramuscular and intravenous injection 1 mg/mL (0.1%)
 «Фезипам» (Phezipam) tablets 0.5 and 1 mg (not to be confused with «Фезам» (Phezam) which contains cinnarizine/piracetam)
 «Фезанеф» (Phezanef) tablets 1 mg

See also 
Benzodiazepine
3-Hydroxyphenazepam—an active metabolite and a designer drug
Delorazepam—7-chlorinated analog
Flubromazepam
Ro07-9749

References 

Benzodiazepines
Chlorobenzenes
Organobromides
Lactams
Designer drugs
Russian drugs
GABAA receptor positive allosteric modulators
Drugs in the Soviet Union